NATO AEP-55 STANAG 4569 is a NATO Standardization Agreement covering the standards for the "Protection Levels for Occupants of Logistic and Light Armored Vehicles".

The standard covers strikes from kinetic energy, artillery and IED blasts.

Level 1

Kinetic Energy
7.62×51mm NATO Ball (Ball M80) at 30 meters with velocity 833 m/s

5.56×45mm NATO Ball (SS109) at 30 meters with a velocity of 900 m/s

5.56×45mm NATO Ball (M193) at 30 meters with a velocity of 937 m/s

Protection against all three threats must be provided.

Grenade and Mine Blast
Hand grenades, unexploded artillery fragmenting submunitions, and other small anti personnel explosive devices detonated under the vehicle.

Artillery
20 mm FSP (simulating 155 mm threat) at 520 m/sec from a distance of 100 meters. (Due to very low probability of a large fragment retaining enough velocity at these distances, STANAG 4569 makes this optional.)

Angle: azimuth 360°; elevation: 0–18°

Level 2

Kinetic Energy
7.62×39mm API BZ at 30 meters with 695 m/s

Grenade and Mine Blast Threat
6 kg (explosive mass) Blast AT Mine:
2a – Mine Explosion pressure activated under any wheel or track location.
2b – Mine Explosion under center.

Artillery
155 mm High Explosive at 80 m

Angle: Azimuth 360°; elevation: 0–22°

Level 3

Kinetic Energy
7.62×51mm AP (WC core) at 30 meters with 930 m/s

Angle: Azimuth 360°; elevation 0–30°

Grenade and Mine Blast Threat
8 kg (explosive mass) Blast AT Mine:
3a – Mine Explosion pressure activated under any wheel or track location.
3b – Mine Explosion under center.

Artillery
155 mm High Explosive at 60 m

Angle: Azimuth 360°; elevation: 0–30°

Level 4

Kinetic Energy
14.5×114mm AP / B32 at 200 meters with 911 m/s

Angle: Azimuth 360°; elevation 0°

Artillery
155 mm High Explosive at 30 m

Grenade and Mine Blast Threat
10 kg (explosive mass) Blast AT Mine:
4a – Mine Explosion pressure activated under any wheel or track location.
4b – Mine Explosion under center.

Level 5

Kinetic Energy
25 mm APDS-T (M791) or TLB 073 at 500 m with 1258 m/s

Angle: Frontal arc to centreline: ± 30° sides included, elevation 0°

Artillery
155 mm High Explosive at 25 m

Angle: Azimuth 360°; elevation: 0–90°

Level 6

Kinetic Energy
30 mm APFSDS or AP at 500 m

Angle: Frontal arc to centreline: ± 30° sides included, elevation 0°

Artillery
155 mm High Explosive at 10 m

Angle: Azimuth 360°; elevation: 0–90°

Sources

4569